The 2012–13 Louisiana–Lafayette Ragin' Cajuns men's basketball team  represented the University of Louisiana at Lafayette during the 2012–13 NCAA Division I men's basketball season. The Ragin' Cajuns, led by third year head coach Bob Marlin, played their home games at the Cajundome and were members of the West Division of the Sun Belt Conference. They finished the season 13–20, 8–12 in Sun Belt play to finish in third place in the West Division. They lost in the quarterfinals of the Sun Belt tournament to Middle Tennessee.

Roster

Schedule

|-
!colspan=12 style=| Exhibition

|-
!colspan=12 style=| Regular season

|-
!colspan=9 style=| 2013 Sun Belt tournament

References

Louisiana Ragin' Cajuns men's basketball seasons
Louisiana-Lafayette
Louisiana
Louisiana